Dishant Mayurbhai Pancholi is a Professor in the Institute of Mathematical Sciences, Chennai with research interests in contact and symplectic topology. Before taking up the position in The Institute Of Mathematical Sciences in 2016, Pancholi was an assistant professor at Chennai Mathematical Institute. He is also a von Newmann Fellow at the Institute for Advanced Study in Princeton, New Jersey. The Singapore based magazine Asian Scientist selected Pancholi as the top ranking Asian Scientist of the year 2020 in a list of 100 Asia’s most outstanding researchers. Pnacholi was awarded the Shanti Swarup Bhatnagar Prize for Science and Technology in Mathematical Sciences in the year 2019.

Pancholi obtained his PhD degree from School of Mathematics, Tata Institute of Fundamental Research, Mumbai in 2006
for a thesis titled "Knots, mapping class groups and Kirby calculus", and MSc degree from Maharaja Sayajirao University of Baroda, Vadodara in 1998.

Honours and recognitions
B M Birla Science prize in 2017 
Shanti Swarup Bhatnagar Prize for Science and Technology in Mathematical Sciences in the year 2019

References

External links
Publications of Dishant Mayurbhai Pancholi indexed in ResearchGate

21st-century Indian mathematicians
Recipients of the Shanti Swarup Bhatnagar Award in Mathematical Science
Living people
Year of birth missing (living people)
Tata Institute of Fundamental Research alumni